Michaëlla Krajicek and Taylor Townsend were the defending champions, but Krajicek chose not to participate. Townsend plays alongside Jessica Pegula, but they withdrew before their quarterfinal match.

Kaitlyn Christian and Sabrina Santamaria won the title after defeating Paula Cristina Gonçalves and Sanaz Marand 6–1, 6–0 in the final.

Seeds

Draw

References
Main Draw

Tennis Classic of Macon - Doubles